Events in the year 1919 in China.

Incumbent

Events

May 
 May 4 – May Fourth Movement, student protests over government's failure in Paris Peace Conference.

August 
 August 9 – Jin Yunpeng served as the Premier of the Republic of China.

October 
 October 10 – The Chinese Revolutionary Party resurrected to the Kuomintang of China (中國國民黨).

References

 
1910s in China
Years of the 20th century in China